Nicholas Zalevsky  (born February 19, 1951, Kiev, Ukraine)  — Ukrainian and American  figurative painter. His works have been associated with Magic realism, Photorealism and Surrealism. He started his career as a Soviet Nonconformist Artist (ukrainian underground) opposing the then dominant to Soviet Socialist realism. He had to create art in the underground.  From 1991 he works out of West Hartford, Connecticut, USA,  with regular visits to his native city.

Awards 
 First Place of an international on-line Art-competition.net —«Scapes-2018» 
Museum of Russian Art, Jersey City, New Jersey, United States  — Best Picture Award, 2012
 West Hartford, Connecticut Art League, United States  — Best Picture Award, 2011
 The Canton's Gallery, Canton, Connecticut, United States,  —  Best Picture Award, 1995

Biography

Nicholas Zalewsky was born on February 19, 1951, in Kiev, Ukraine,  to an ethnically mixed  family of a Ukrainian mother and a Jewish father. Zalevsky's only sibling is,  — his brother Vladislav  who is 17 years his senior. From his early childhood, Nicholas showed a talent for drawing, which led him to study in specialized Shevchenko State Art School in Kiev from where he,  —graduated in 1968 (as his friend Les Podervianskyi). Then he attended the Ukrainian Academy of Printing in Kiev graduating from its Department of Graphic Arts in 1976 and moving on to work as a children books illustrator. He was friends with artists and teachers Florian Yuryev and Vilen Barskyi (sometimes he worked as a bodybuilder in his drawing lessons).

His artistic position drastically differed from the canon of  Socialist Realism.  His artistic views being greatly different from those that conformed to the canons  Socialist Realism. In 1977, Nickolas took part in underground art exhibition by  the art association «Rukh» («Movement») along with such artists as Mykola Trehub,  Vudon Baklitsky,   Yuri Kosin,  Alexander Kostetsky, Olena Golub  and others. Naturally, he did not expect to achieve any success in a country that did not let him develop his talent. For years, Zalevsky lived by doing odd jobs while exhibiting his paintings in such conditions  as private apartments or abandoned buildings. This led the artist to seek and develop new directions in his work. In 1991, he and his family moved to the US joining his elder brother who had already settled there.

Creativity 
Zalevsky's painting manner exhibits the features of narrative fiction  based on the discourse of the absurd associated with the works of Arthur Rimbaud, Samuel Beckett, and Charles Bukowski. 
«I always wanted to blow up this perfectly-fed world of Dutch still life. The picture is not entitled to be a supplement to the expensive interior»  — writes  Zalevsky . His "Dutch Still Life" (2005) contains, in addition to ordinary objects (such as potatoes, an onion, a plate and a bottle of beer) a cut-off human finger which does not belong to this traditionally set group of objects. Zalevsky's multi-figured composition "Crucifixion" (1996) gives an unusual treatment to the theme of Christ by depicting only one of his nail-pierced hands of gigantic size stuck out of an entrance to a NYC subway station. His interpretation of such mythological figures as Salome (2002) and Centaur (2016) denies them their customary pathos and heroism. Zalevsky works on his every in painstakingly careful and lengthy way, with many preparatory drawings, during several years for one painting. As a result, his paintings have received much attention and appreciation at international art competitions.

Exhibitions  
 2012 —  Museum of Russian Art, Jersey City, New Jersey, USA, (personal exhibition)     
 2012 — Museum of Russian Art, Jersey City, New Jersey, USA, Best Picture Award
  2011 —  West Hartford Art League, West Hartford, Connecticut, USA, (personal exhibition).
 2011 —  CT +6, West Hartford Art League, West Hartford, Connecticut, USA, Best of Show Award.
 2009  — Jewish Community Center, West Hartford, Connecticut, USA
 2006 —  Gallery "Collection", Kiev, Ukraine (personal exhibition).
 1995 —  The Canton's Gallery, Canton, Connecticut, USA, Best Picture Award.
1977,1978 —  exhibitions of underground creative association «Rukh»(«Movement»), Kiev, Ukraine

Notes

Sources 
 in ukr.: Glib Viches, Sidor Hibelynda-O.  // Terminology of Modern Art, Paris-Kyiv, Terra Incognita, 2010,   - P.239.  
 in ukr.:' Olena Golub.Dialogue across the ocean. //Den(The  Day), 2006,  —Dec.9

External links 
 Nick Zalevsky
 Nicholas Zalevsky. Ukrainian Art Library (ukr.)
 :uk:Залевський Микола Рахмілович Ukrainian Wikipedia

1951 births
Living people
American contemporary painters
Postmodern artists
Ukrainian artists
Painters from Connecticut
Shevchenko State Art School alumni
Ukrainian SSR emigrants to the United States